The  is a locomotive-hauled set of "Joyful Train" railway coaches operated in Japan by the East Japan Railway Company (JR East), normally between  and .

Operations
It is also occasionally used on other excursion services.

Formation
The dedicated trainset consists of seven 12 series passenger coaches converted from regular day coaches. Car number SuRoFu 12 102 is a Green (first class) observation car converted in 2013 from the former SuHaFu 12 102 standard-class seating car. It has 2+1 unidirectional seating and an observation space at the end of the car, and is finished in a new maroon and black livery.

SuRoFu 12 102
The "Green" (first class) observation car SuRoFu 12 102 was rebuilt in 2013 from the original standard class car SuHaFu 12 102. The train end of the car includes a conductor's office and general-purpose room.

History

The Banetsu Monogatari trainset entered service on 29 April 1999, originally painted in a livery of chocolate and cream.

In late 2000, a lounge car with observation windows, OHa 12 1701, converted from SuHaFu 12 160, was inserted into the train, extending it to seven cars.

In 2007, the set was refurbished and repainted in a new blue and cream livery intended to evoke the colour scheme of the Orient Express. A sales counter was also added in car OHa 12 315 at the same time.

From 6 April 2013, SL Banetsu Monogatari services resumed with a new Green (first class) observation car, SuRoFu 12 102, as car 7, modified from the former SuHaFu 12 102.

In 2014, the SL Banetsu Monogatari train set was refurbished, with all cars repainted in the same black and sienna livery as the "Green" car SuRoFu 12 102. The rebuilt train returned to service from 5 April 2014.

See also
 List of named passenger trains of Japan

References

External links

 SL Banetsu Monogatari (JR East) 
 SLばんえつ物語 (JR East – Niigata Branch) 

Named passenger trains of Japan
East Japan Railway Company
Railway services introduced in 1999
Railway coaches of Japan